Anthony Eugene McGee (born January 18, 1949) is a former professional American football player who played fourteen seasons in the National Football League (NFL), including two Super Bowls with the Washington Redskins.  After being dismissed from the University of Wyoming football team as part of the Black 14 in 1969,  McGee continued his college football career at Bishop College and was selected in the third round of the 1971 NFL Draft by the Chicago Bears.

College career
Born and raised in Battle Creek, Michigan, McGee played college football at the University of Wyoming in Laramie. But on Friday, October 17, the day before the home game against BYU, McGee and thirteen other African American players went to head coach  office to discuss how they might participate in a protest called by the UW Black Students Alliance against the Church of Jesus Christ of Latter-day Saints tenet which prohibited black men from becoming priests. As soon as Eaton saw them wearing black arm bands, he took them into the Memorial Fieldhouse bleachers and immediately informed them they were all off the team because they violated the coach's rule against participating 

The rule was withdrawn the next week, but the players were not reinstated. McGee and five others were starters, and after this, the Wyoming football program was not the same. Although the suddenly all-white Cowboys defeated BYU and San Jose State to improve to  they lost their four road games in November. In 1970, the Cowboys went  and Eaton "retired" from coaching, reassigned to assistant  Wyoming posted only one winning season in the 1970s, 

Three of the Black 14 underclassmen returned to the team  but McGee finished his college career in Texas at Bishop College in Dallas. He was projected to be a first round pick in the 1971 NFL Draft, but fell to the third round (64th overall) because word passed around that he was a troublemaker due to his dismissal from Wyoming and his involvement

Professional career
McGee played 14 years as a defensive lineman in the NFL with the Chicago Bears  New England Patriots  and Washington Redskins   Known as "Mac the Sack" because of his ability to get to the quarterback, McGee had a career total of 106.5 sacks. A durable defensive lineman, McGee played in 203 games, missing only one game during his entire NFL career. While with the Redskins, McGee played in Super Bowls XVII (1983) and XVIII (1984), winning the former.

TV career
McGee is the founder and host of the longest running minority-owned sports talk show in the Washington, D.C. region. His "Pro Football Plus" television show is celebrating thirty-eight seasons of broadcasting excellence.

References

External links
 
 Pro Football Plus - http://www.redmagplus.com/index.htm

1949 births
Living people
Sportspeople from Battle Creek, Michigan
American football defensive ends
Bishop Tigers football players
Chicago Bears players
New England Patriots players
Players of American football from Michigan
Washington Redskins players
Wyoming Cowboys football players